The 2014 Uzbekistan Cup was the 22nd season of the annual Uzbek football Cup competition. The Cup draw was held on 21 February 2014 in Tashkent.

The competition started on 30 March 2014 and ended on 12 November 2014 with the final held at the Pakhtakor Markaziy Stadium in Tashkent. Bunyodkor, the defending champions 2013 and runners-up Lokomotiv Tashkent started from quarter-final stage of the Cup.

The cup winner is guaranteed a place in the 2015 AFC Champions League.

Calendar

First round
On 30 March 2014 Cup matches start with first round matches to define teams of Round of 32.

Bracket

Round of 32

The one leg matches will be played on April 19–20.

|}

Round of 16
The sixteen winners from the Round of 32 were drawn into eight two-legged ties. 

|}

Quarterfinal

|}

Semifinal

|}

Final

|}

Goalscorers

Last updated: 1 July 2014
Source: UzPFL

References

Cup
Uzbekistan Cup
2014